Lisa Bonder (born October 16, 1965), also known as Lisa Bonder-Kreiss or Lisa Bonder-Kerkorian, is an American former professional tennis player. During her career, she won four singles titles on the WTA circuit and reached a highest ranking of No. 9 in August 1984.

Career
Bonder played on the WTA tour from 1981 to 1991 and won four titles before retiring, the first in 1982 in Hamburg, West Germany, and then three tournaments in Tokyo from 1982 to 1983. She reached the fourth round of the US Open in 1983 and 1984 and at Wimbledon in 1984. She also reached a quarterfinal at Roland Garros in 1984. Notable career victories include wins over Chris Evert, Mary Joe Fernandez, and  Andrea Jaeger. Bonder reached a career high ranking of no. 9 and retired with a 139–126 win–loss record.

Personal life

Parents 
Born in Columbus, Ohio to Seth and Julia Bonder, who later divorced, she was raised in Saline, Michigan. Her father Seth, an American engineer who founded Vector Research, Inc., was born in the Bronx, New York to Russian emigrants who worked in the garment district.

Change of name and son 
She married Tom Kreiss on 10 January 1988, and changed her surname to Bonder-Kreiss. She and Kreiss have a son named Taylor Jennings Kreiss. She divorced Kreiss to marry billionaire Kirk Kerkorian in 1999 whom she divorced within one month.

Daughter 
Bonder was involved in a high-profile child support lawsuit with Kirk Kerkorian, her ex-husband of 28 days. Kerkorian, 48 years her senior, suspected that Steve Bing, Bonder's ex-boyfriend, was the father of her daughter. Kerkorian hired Anthony Pellicano, "private eye to the stars", during the dispute. Pellicano took used dental floss from Bing's discarded waste to obtain DNA paternity testing, succeeding in confirming that Bing was the father. Pellicano also wiretapped Bonder's phone calls. Pellicano subsequently was convicted on various charges, including wiretapping and racketeering, involving this case and many other cases, and he received a 15-year prison sentence. One of Kerkorian's attorneys was convicted of racketeering for hiring Pellicano to tap Bonder's phone and received a three-year prison sentence, later confirmed on appeal.

WTA Career finals

Singles: 5 (4–1)

Doubles: 1 (0–1)

Grand Slam singles performance timeline

References

External links
 
 

1965 births
Living people
American female tennis players
Sportspeople from Beverly Hills, California
Sportspeople from Columbus, Ohio
People from Saline, Michigan
Tennis people from California
Tennis people from Michigan
Tennis people from Ohio
20th-century American women